Damir Grlić (born 14 August 1975) is a Croatian retired football defender and later manager. He is currently assistant to manager Ivan Prelec at Danish side Vejle BK. He also worked with Prelec at Gorica and Istra.

References

1975 births
Living people
Footballers from Zagreb
Association football defenders
Croatian footballers
NK Hrvatski Dragovoljac players
1. FK Příbram players
FK Teplice players
FK Mladá Boleslav players
HNK Gorica players
Croatian Football League players
Czech First League players
Croatian expatriate footballers
Expatriate footballers in the Czech Republic
Croatian expatriate sportspeople in the Czech Republic
Croatian football managers
HNK Gorica managers
HAŠK managers
Croatian expatriate sportspeople in Denmark